The Trampolining competition for the 2014 Pacific Rim Gymnastics Championships was held on 10 April to 12 April 2014 at the Richmond Olympic Oval. The juniors and seniors competed together in the team final but competed separately for the synchro and individual competition. The synchro competition was held on 10 April, the individual and team competitions were held on 11 April, and finals were held on 12 April.

Team

Men's team
Results

Women's team
Results

Senior

Men's Individual
Results

Men's Synchro
Results

Women's Individual
Results

Women's Synchro
Results

Junior

Men's Individual
Results

Men's Synchro
Results

Women's Individual
Results

Women's Synchro
Results

References

Pacific Rim Championships
Pacific Rim Gymnastics Championships